Killer Cop  is a 1975 Italian poliziottesco-crime film directed in 1975 by Luciano Ercoli. The film's plot reprises the Piazza Fontana bombing which happened in Milan in 1969. The gun in the umbrella used in the movie is similar to a Bulgarian umbrella used at London in 1978 to kill Bulgarian dissident Georgi Markov.

Cast 
 Claudio Cassinelli as Commissioner Matteo Rolandi
 Arthur Kennedy as Armando Di Federico
 Franco Fabrizi as Luigi Balsamo
 Sara Sperati as Papaya Girotti
 Bruno Zanin as Franco Ludovisi
 Valeria D'Obici as Falena
 Enzo Fisichella as Francalancia
 Paolo Poiret as Rocco Altieri
 Giovanni Cianfriglia as Hitman
 Jack Lemmon as Narrator (voice, English version)

Production
Killer Cop was shot in Milan. Killer Cop'''s plot is influenced from the Piazza Fontana bombings. The funerals seen in the film on a television screen are actual footage of the funerals of the victims of the bombings.

ReleaseKiller Cop was released in Italy on March 27, 1975 where it was distributed by Prouzioni Atlas consorziate (P.A.C.). It grossed 854,798,250 Italian lire.Killer Cop'' has been released  on DVD in Italy by Cecchi Gori with a running time of 92 minutes and 58 seconds.

Footnotes

References

External links

1975 films
Poliziotteschi films
1975 crime films
Films directed by Luciano Ercoli
Films scored by Stelvio Cipriani
Films shot in Milan
1970s Italian films